The Caproni Ca.2 was an Italian heavy bomber of the World War I era.

Development
The Ca.2 was a minor development of the Caproni Ca.1 twin-boom bomber of 1914. It had become evident early in the Ca.1's service life that the design could benefit from more power. Caproni therefore replaced the central, pusher engine of the aircraft with a more powerful one. Caproni referred to this as the Caproni 350 hp at the time, and the Italian Army dubbed it the Ca.2. No separate number seems to have been allocated to it in Caproni's postwar redesignation scheme.

Only nine aircraft were built, supplied to the Italian Army alongside deliveries of Ca.1s between August 1915 and December 1916.

The benefits of increased power encouraged Caproni to continue in this direction, leading to the definitive Caproni Ca.3.

Description
The Caproni Ca.2 was a trimotor biplane with an engine mounted on the rear of the central nacelle, and two others mounted on the front of twin booms, which held the tail. It was largely of wooden construction, covered with fabric. The crew of four were in an open central nacelle (front gunner, two pilots and rear gunner-mechanic). The rear gunner manned upper machine guns, standing over the central engine in a protective "cage," just in front of its propeller. It was fitted with tricycle landing gear.

Armament consisted of two to four Revelli 6.5 mm or 7.7 mm machine guns, one on a front ring mount and one, two or sometimes even three on an upper ring mount. Bombs were suspended under the central nacelle.

Operators

Corpo Aeronautico Militare

Specifications (Ca.2)

See also

References

 Aerei Italiani (Italian)

Ca.002
1910s Italian bomber aircraft
Three-engined push-pull aircraft
Military aircraft of World War I
Biplanes
Aircraft first flown in 1915

pl:Caproni Ca.3